The 2011 Adecco Ex-Yu Cup was the first edition of this tournament, created with the aim to create a new Cup for the Ex-Yugoslavia countries.

Six teams played the inaugural edition in summer 2011. The inaugural edition was held in Arena Stožice from Ljubljana, Slovenia. The teams are divided in two groups of three teams. The top teams play the Final of the tournament.

Venues

Participating teams

Preliminary round
All times are local Central European Summer Time (UTC+2).

Group A

|}

Group B

|}

Final round
All times are local Central European Summer Time (UTC+2).

5th place

Third place

Final

Final standings

References

External links
2011 Stats at Slovenian Basketball Federation website

2011
2011–12 in Serbian basketball
2011–12 in Slovenian basketball
2011–12 in Croatian basketball
2011–12 in Bosnia and Herzegovina basketball
2011–12 in Montenegrin basketball
2011–12 in Republic of Macedonia basketball
International basketball competitions hosted by Slovenia
Sport in Ljubljana